Christopher Garnett Howsin Spafford  (1924-2011) was Provost of Newcastle from 1976 to 1989.

Spafford was born into an ecclesiastical family  on 10 September 1924, educated at Marlborough College and St John's College, Oxford and ordained in 1950. After curacies at Brighouse and Huddersfield he held incumbencies at Hebden Bridge, Thornhill and Shrewsbury. He was Provost of Newcastle Cathedral from  1976 to 1989.

Reverend Christopher Spafford died in September 2011.

References

1924 births
People educated at Marlborough College
Alumni of St John's College, Cambridge
Provosts and Deans of Newcastle
2011 deaths